Stranger's Soul  ( Ourishi hogin) was an Armenian romantic melodrama television series based on the popular En otra piel Spanish-language telenovela. The series premiered on Shant TV on August 31, 2015.
The series takes place in Yerevan, Armenia. TV series' directors were Armen Mirzoyan and Hayk Vardanyan, co-directors were Erik Ghukasyan and Meri Arakelyan.

Series overview

Cast and characters

Recurring cast

References

External links
 

Armenian drama television series
Armenian-language television shows
2015 Armenian television series debuts
2010s Armenian television series
Shant TV original programming